Caspar Widmer (28 May 1874 – 27 March 1953) was a Swiss sports shooter. He competed at the 1906 Intercalated Games and the 1920 Summer Olympics.

References

External links
 

1874 births
1953 deaths
People from Willisau District
Swiss male sport shooters
Olympic shooters of Switzerland
Shooters at the 1906 Intercalated Games
Shooters at the 1920 Summer Olympics
Sportspeople from the canton of Lucerne